Carl Ernst Bernhard Jutz, also Carl Jutz der Jüngere (14 March 1873 – 17 September 1915) was a German landscape painter of the Düsseldorf school of painting.

Life 
Jutz was born in Düsseldorf, the son of the animal painter  and his wife Sybilla Karolina, née Adloff, the daughter of the landscape painter Carl Adloff. There, he grew up in a house where poultry was kept in the garden for his father's animal painting. Jutz undertook extensive study trips, including to Transylvania, whose motifs he captured in watercolour and oil. Many of his pictures show Eifel landscapes. He was regularly represented at international, national and Düsseldorf art exhibitions. He served as second chairman of the Düsseldorf Große Kunstausstellung NRW Düsseldorf. In Die Ortenau. Like his father, Jutz was also a member of the Malkasten. A photo from 1910 shows Jutz with an easel in front of a winter backdrop.

Jutz died near Radun (now Belarus) on the East Front (WWI) at the age of 42.

 Work 

Jutz's landscape painting was founded in the romantic tradition of the Düsseldorf School and developed towards a broad Late Impressionist style. Painting with brightened, strongly luminous colouring. Atmospheric landscapes characterize his later work. A few animal paintings can also be found in his oeuvre.

 Alter Baum mit Landschaft, Museum Kunstpalast, Düsseldorf.
 Hühnerstall Dorflandschaft Kiefernwald mit Waldkapelle Schloss Bürresheim bei Mayen in der Eifel Schafherde bei der Ruine Nothberg in der Eifel Mühlteich, um 1900
 Herbstliche Landschaft mit Dorf im Hintergrund, 1903
 Dorf am Rhein Herbstmorgen an der Erft Wäscherinnen am Waldbach Reetgedeckte Bauernhäuser In der Eifel (Reusenfischer im Kahn) Kirche in der Eifel References 

 Further reading 
 Jutz, Carl Ernst Bernhard. In Hans Vollmer (ed.): Allgemeines Lexikon der Bildenden Künstler von der Antike bis zur Gegenwart. Created by Ulrich Thieme and Felix Becker. VOl. 19: Ingouville–Kauffungen. E. A. Seemann, Leipzig 1926.
  (ed.): Lexikon der Düsseldorfer Malerschule 1819–1918. Vol. 2: Haach–Murtfeldt.'' Published by the Kunstmuseum Düsseldorf in Ehrenhof and by the Galerie Paffrath. Bruckmann, Munich 1998, .

External links 

 Carl Jutz (II), on Netherlands Institute for Art History
 Carl Jutz the Younger, Auction result

19th-century German painters
19th-century German male artists
20th-century German painters
20th-century German male artists
German landscape painters
German watercolourists
German Impressionist painters
1873 births
1915 deaths
Artists from Düsseldorf
German military personnel killed in World War I